Laura is an unincorporated community in Martin County, Kentucky, United States. It is located at  (37.7259317, -82.4429252) at an elevation of 676 feet (206 m). The zip code is 41250.

References

Unincorporated communities in Martin County, Kentucky
Unincorporated communities in Kentucky